The 1948 Chatham Cup was the 21st annual nationwide knockout football competition in New Zealand.

The competition was run on a regional basis, with regional associations each holding separate qualifying rounds. Teams taking part in the final rounds are known to have included Eastern Suburbs (Auckland), Waterside (Wellington), Technical Old Boys (Christchurch), and Roslyn-Wakari (Dunedin).

the 1948 final
The final was a re-match of the previous years' final, with Technical Old Boys gaining revenge over Waterside for their loss of the previous year. The Waterside team proved disappointing when compared to their team of the previous year, and it was Tech who dominated. Though the Wharfies held the Canterbury side to a 0-0 half-time score, they succumbed in the second half to goals by Peter O'Malley and Cyril Thomas.

Results

Semi-finals

Final

References

Rec.Sport.Soccer Statistics Foundation New Zealand 1948 page

Chatham Cup
Chatham Cup
Chatham Cup